Local elections in Mandaluyong were held on May 13, 2019, within the Philippine general election. The voters elected for the elective local posts in the city: the mayor, vice mayor, one Congressman, and the councilors, six in each of the city's two legislative districts.

Background 
Then-mayor Carmelita Abalos was elected in 2016 and sought for reelection. Independent candidate Florencio Solomon challenged Abalos for the top post.

Results 
Abalos easily won re-election as mayor with 128,661 votes against her opponent's 8,589 votes. Her running mate Suva won re-election as vice-mayor with 111,922 votes against his opponent's 18,981 votes.

Mayoral election

Vice Mayoral election

Congressional election

Council elections

1st District 

|-bgcolor=black
|colspan=25|

2nd District 

|-bgcolor=black
|colspan=25|

References 

2019 Philippine local elections
Politics of Mandaluyong
May 2019 events in the Philippines
2019 elections in Metro Manila